In mathematics, specifically in algebraic topology, the Euler class is a characteristic class of oriented, real vector bundles. Like other characteristic classes, it measures how "twisted" the vector bundle is. In the case of the tangent bundle of a smooth manifold, it generalizes the classical notion of Euler characteristic.  It is named after Leonhard Euler because of this.

Throughout this article  is an oriented, real vector bundle of rank  over a base space .

Formal definition 
The Euler class  is an element of the integral cohomology group

constructed as follows. An orientation of  amounts to a continuous choice of generator of the cohomology

of each fiber  relative to the complement  of zero. From the Thom isomorphism, this induces an orientation class

in the cohomology of  relative to the complement  of the zero section . The inclusions

where  includes into  as the zero section, induce maps

The Euler class e(E) is the image of u under the composition of these maps.

Properties 
The Euler class satisfies these properties, which are axioms of a characteristic class:

In particular, .
Whitney sum formula: If  is another oriented, real vector bundle, then the Euler class of their direct sum is given by 
Normalization: If  possesses a nowhere-zero section, then .

Note that "Normalization" is a distinguishing feature of the Euler class. The Euler class obstructs the existence of a non-vanishing section in the sense that if  then  has no non-vanishing section. 

Also unlike other characteristic classes, it is concentrated in a degree which depends on the rank of the bundle: . This reflects the fact that the Euler class is unstable, as discussed below.

Vanishing locus of generic section 
Suppose that  is an oriented smooth manifold of dimension . Let  be a smooth section that transversely intersects the zero section.

Self-intersection 

Relations to other invariants 
In the special case when the bundle E in question is the tangent bundle of a compact, oriented, r-dimensional manifold, the Euler class is an element of the top cohomology of the manifold, which is naturally identified with the integers by evaluating cohomology classes on the fundamental homology class. Under this identification, the Euler class of the tangent bundle equals the Euler characteristic of the manifold. In the language of characteristic numbers, the Euler characteristic is the characteristic number corresponding to the Euler class.

Thus the Euler class is a generalization of the Euler characteristic to vector bundles other than tangent bundles. In turn, the Euler class is the archetype for other characteristic classes of vector bundles, in that each "top" characteristic class equals the Euler class, as follows.

Modding out by 2 induces a map

The image of the Euler class under this map is the top Stiefel-Whitney class wr(E). One can view this Stiefel-Whitney class as "the Euler class, ignoring orientation".

Any complex vector bundle E of complex rank d can be regarded as an oriented, real vector bundle E of real rank 2d. The Euler class of E is given by the highest dimensional Chern class

Squares to top Pontryagin class
The Pontryagin class  is defined as the Chern class of the complexification of E: .

Comparing Euler classes, we see that

Instability
A characteristic class  is stable if  where  is a rank one trivial bundle.
Unlike most other characteristic classes, the Euler class is unstable. In fact, .

The Euler class is represented by a cohomology class in the classifying space BSO(k)  . The unstability of the Euler class shows that it is not the pull-back of a class in  under the inclusion .

This can be seen intuitively in that the Euler class is a class whose degree depends on the dimension of the bundle (or manifold, if the tangent bundle): the Euler class is an element of  where  is the dimension of the bundle, while the other classes have a fixed dimension (e.g., the first Stiefel-Whitney class is an element of ).

The fact that the Euler class is unstable should not be seen as a "defect": rather, it means that the Euler class "detects unstable phenomena".

Examples

Spheres 
The Euler characteristic of the n-sphere Sn is:

Thus, there is no non-vanishing section of the tangent bundle of even spheres (this is known as the Hairy ball theorem). In particular, the tangent bundle of an even sphere is nontrivial—i.e.,  is not a parallelizable manifold, and cannot admit a Lie group structure.

For odd spheres, S2n−1 ⊂ R2n, a nowhere vanishing section is given by

which shows that the Euler class vanishes; this is just n copies of the usual section over the circle.

Since the tangent bundle of the sphere is stably trivial but not trivial, all other characteristic classes vanish on it, and the Euler class is the only ordinary cohomology class that detects non-triviality of the tangent bundle of spheres: to prove further results, one must use secondary cohomology operations or K-theory.

Circle 
The cylinder is a line bundle over the circle, by the natural projection . It is a trivial line bundle, so it possesses a nowhere-zero section, and so its Euler class is 0. It is also isomorphic to the tangent bundle of the circle; the fact that its Euler class is 0 corresponds to the fact that the Euler characteristic of the circle is 0.

See also 
 Vandermonde polynomial
 Thom isomorphism
 Generalized Gauss–Bonnet theorem

Other classes 
 Chern class
 Pontryagin class
 Stiefel-Whitney class

References 

Characteristic classes